Brezovica pri Medvodah is a small settlement in the Municipality of Medvode in the Upper Carniola region of Slovenia.

Name
Brezovica pri Medvodah was attested in historical sources as Pirg in 1444. The name of the settlement was changed from Brezovica to Brezovica pri Medvodah in 1953. In the past the German name was Bresowitz.

Church

The local church, built on a hill above the village, is dedicated to Saint James.

References

External links

Brezovica pri Medvodah on Geopedia

Populated places in the Municipality of Medvode